Akshiy (Aqşi) is a village in the Almaty Region of south-eastern Kazakhstan. Akshiy is located along the A351 highway, to the east of Baltabay.

External links
Tageo.com

Populated places in Almaty Region